Emma Rose Regan (born January 28, 2000) is a Canadian international soccer player who plays as a defender for Danish club HB Køge. She appeared for the Canada women's national soccer team in one match at the 2018 CONCACAF Women's Championship.

Early life
Regan began playing youth soccer at age six with Burnaby Girls SC. She later played for Mountain United FC, before joining the Vancouver Whitecaps REX program. She also played for the British Columbia provincial team. She also represented BC at the 2017 Canada Summer Games. She served as the Vancouver Whitecaps captain since 2014 and was named "Most Promising Player" in 2015, also being named the BC Soccer Youth Player of the Year in 2015.

College career
She began attending the University of Texas at Austin in 2018 playing for the women's soccer team. She was named to the 2018 Top Drawer Soccer National Preseason Best XI Freshman Team, the 2019 Preseason All-Big 12 Conference Team, and the 2019 All-Big 12 Conference Second Team. She scored her first goal on October 9, 2020 against the Kansas State Wildcats. In 2021 and 2022, she was again named to the All-Big 12 Conference Second Team and was named to the United Soccer Coaches All-Midwest Region Third Team in 2021. In 2022, she was named the 2022 Big 12 Conference Soccer Co-Scholar Athlete of the Year and was a four time Academic All-Big 12 First Team.

Club career
In 2018, she played with TSS FC Rovers in the Women's Premier Soccer League, scoring two goals.

In 2022, she joined Varsity FC of League1 British Columbia.

In January 2023, she signed her first professional contract with Danish club HB Køge.

International career
She debuted for the Canada U15 team at the 2014 CONCACAF Girls' U-15 Championship, helping Canada win the championship, being named a tournament all-star.

She has also represented the Canada U17 and Canada U20. She debuted with the U20 team as a 15 year old in 2015, and played as a 16 year old at the 2016 FIFA U-20 Women's World Cup. She was again called up for the 2020 CONCACAF Women's U-20 Championship.

Regan earned her first call-up to the Canada senior team in June 2018, ahead of a friendly against Germany. She was then called up for the 2018 CONCACAF Women's Championship, making her senior debut against Cuba on October 8, 2018.

External links

References

2000 births
Living people
Canadian women's soccer players
Canada women's international soccer players
Women's association football defenders
Texas Longhorns women's soccer players
Soccer players from Vancouver
Sportspeople from North Vancouver
Canadian expatriate women's soccer players
Expatriate women's soccer players in the United States
Canadian expatriate sportspeople in the United States
TSS FC Rovers players
Women's Premier Soccer League players
League1 British Columbia players
Nautsa’mawt FC players
HB Køge (women) players